The Sporting Life 10K is an annual 10K running/walking event on Yonge Street in Toronto, that has taken place every May since 2003. Money raised from the Sporting Life 10K goes towards funding Camp Oochigeas – a volunteer-run summer camp to provide enriching experiences to victims of childhood cancer. 

27,000 people participated in 2013.

References

Challenge walks